A mayoral election was held on November 2, 2021, to elect the mayor of the U.S. city of Minneapolis. Incumbent DFL mayor Jacob Frey won reelection to a second term, becoming the first Minneapolis mayor to win a second term since R. T. Rybak in 2005. Minneapolis mayoral elections use instant-runoff voting, also known as ranked-choice voting. All candidates appear on the same ballot and there is no primary election, nor is there a runoff. Minneapolis's twin city, Saint Paul, also held a mayoral election on the same day, using the same system.

Background

2017 election

Frey announced his candidacy for mayor of Minneapolis on January 3, 2017, and won the November 7 election. He was sworn into office on January 2, 2018.

Frey is Minneapolis's second Jewish mayor, and its second-youngest after Al Hofstede, who was 34 when he was elected in 1973. Frey campaigned on a platform of increasing support for affordable housing and improving police-community relations.

Candidates

Declared
Nate "Honey Badger" Atkins (Libertarian), unconventional Libertarian
A.J. Awed (DFL), co-executive director of the Cedar-Riverside Community Council
Troy Benjegerdes (DFL), software engineer and candidate for mayor in 2013 and 2017
Bob Carney (Republican)
Clint Conner (DFL), attorney and social justice advocate
Christopher David (DFL)
Jacob Frey (DFL), incumbent mayor
Mark Globus (DFL), attorney and business leader
Marcus Harcus (Grassroots-Legalize Cannabis), executive director of the Minnesota Campaign for Full Legalization
Paul Johnson (Humanitarian-Community Party)
Kate Knuth (DFL), educator and former state representative
Doug Nelson (Socialist Workers)
Sheila June Nezhad (DFL), community organizer
Jerrell Perry (For the People Party)
Laverne Turner (Republican), political advisor
Kevin Ward (Independent)
Mike Winter (Independence), commercial driver, podcast host, and Teamster Union steward

Withdrew
David Tilsen (DFL), former Minneapolis School Board member (endorsed Nezhad)
Philip Sturm (DFL), U.S. Marine Corps veteran

Endorsements 
Seven DFL members of the Minnesota State Legislature signed a letter urging Minneapolis residents not to reelect Frey and to instead elect a new mayor who would fight racial discrimination while improving public safety. The legislators who signed the letter were senators Scott Dibble and Omar Fateh and representatives Esther Agbaje, Jim Davnie, Aisha Gomez, Emma Greenman, and Hodan Hassan. The letter stops short of endorsing any specific candidate, but Agbaje, Davnie, Dibble, and Greenman separately endorsed Knuth. Gomez endorsed both Nezhad and Knuth.

Fundraising

Polling

Results

Notes 

Partisan clients

See also 

 2021 Minneapolis municipal election
2021 Minneapolis Question 2

References

External links
 Minneapolis Elections & Voter Services

Official campaign websites
 A.J. Awed (D) for Mayor
 Jacob Frey (D) for Mayor
 Kate Knuth (D) for Mayor
 Sheila June Nezhad (D) for Mayor
 Philip Sturm (D) for Mayor 
Mark Globus (D) for Mayor

Minneapolis
Minneapolis
Local elections in Minnesota